The 2011 American Le Mans Northeast Grand Prix was held at Lime Rock Park on July 9, 2011.  It was the third round of the 2011 American Le Mans Series season.

Qualifying

Qualifying Result
Pole position winners in each class are marked in bold.

Race

Race result
Class winners in bold.  Cars failing to complete 70% of their class winner's distance are marked as Not Classified (NC).

References

Northeast Grand Prix
Northeast Grand Prix
Grand